Harvey John Goodman (born 6 April 1967 in Bolton) is a British-born Australian male weightlifter, competing in the 94 kg category and representing Australia at international competitions. He participated at the 1992 Summer Olympics in the 90 kg event and at the 1996 Summer Olympics in the 91 kg event. He competed at world championships, most recently at the 1999 World Weightlifting Championships.

Major results

References

External links
 
 
 

1967 births
Living people
Australian male weightlifters
Weightlifters at the 1996 Summer Olympics
Olympic weightlifters of Australia
People from Bolton
Weightlifters at the 1992 Summer Olympics
Weightlifters at the 1990 Commonwealth Games
Weightlifters at the 1994 Commonwealth Games
Commonwealth Games gold medallists for Australia
Commonwealth Games bronze medallists for Australia
Commonwealth Games medallists in weightlifting
20th-century Australian people
21st-century Australian people
Medallists at the 1990 Commonwealth Games
Medallists at the 1994 Commonwealth Games